Juha Nurmi (born 25 February 1959) is a retired Finnish ice hockey center who last played for Luleå Hockey in Elitserien (now SHL) in 1990. Nurmi played for Tappara when they won the Finnish championships in 1982.

Career 
Nurmi has played 196 games in Liiga with 158 points and 141 games in Elitserien with 121 points.

References 

Living people
1959 births
Finnish ice hockey centres
Tappara players
HC TPS players
Luleå HF players
Finnish expatriate ice hockey players in Sweden
Washington Capitals draft picks
Sportspeople from Tampere